Dreamer is the fourth studio album by Christian metalcore band Haste the Day. The album was released on October 14, 2008 through Solid State Records. A song from the album, entitled "68" was released on the band's MySpace on August 1. A second new song, the second track off the album entitled "Mad Man," was made available for download on iTunes September 9. The third song Haste the Day has announced the release of is "Haunting," which was posted on the band's Myspace on September 6, 2008. The final track on the album, "Autumn" is originally from Haste the Day's first release That They May Know You. They released a music video for the song Mad Man on February 24, 2009. This is the last album to feature Devin Chaulk, Brennan Chaulk and Jason Barnes (although Jason Barnes went uncredited; he had been fired from the band earlier in the year after having decided to become an atheist).

The album sold 7,700 copies in the United States in its first week of release to debut at position No. 68 on the Billboard 200 chart.

On March 2, 2010, the album was released digitally with new artwork and two acoustic bonus tracks.

Track listing

Digital re-release
 "An Adult Tree (acoustic)"
 "Haunting (acoustic)"

Credits 
Haste the Day
Stephen Keech – lead vocals, additional guitars
Brennan Chaulk – lead/rhythm guitar, vocals
Michael Murphy – bass guitar, vocals
Devin Chaulk – drums, vocals

Production
Andreas Lars Magnusson - producer, engineering, mixing
Chris Dowhan - assistant engineering
UE Nastasi - mastering
Ryan Clark for Invisible Creature - illustration, design, art direction
Ryan Adkins - studio manager
Adam Zeigler - runner
Recorded at Azmyth Recording, Indianapolis, Indiana
Mixed at Planet Red Studios, Richmond, Virginia
Mastered at Sterling Sound, New York City

References

2008 albums
Haste the Day albums
Solid State Records albums